
The Finnish Main Line is a  long electrified main railway line in Finland, today between the cities of Helsinki and Oulu. The Main Line was first opened on March 17, 1862; at that point, the  railway line only ran from Helsinki to Hämeenlinna.

The railway serves Helsinki, Riihimäki, Hämeenlinna, Tampere, Parkano, Seinäjoki, Kokkola, Ylivieska and Oulu. The future Suomirata project aims to improve the current Riihimäki–Tampere section by either building additional tracks alongside the existing main line or an entirely new straight line. The goal is to reduce the travel time from Tampere to Helsinki from the current 1 hour 33 minutes to about an hour.

See also
 Helsinki–Riihimäki railway
 Riihimäki–Tampere railway
 Rail transport in Finland

Notes

References

General references

External links
 Päärata 

Railway lines in Finland
Uusimaa
Kanta-Häme
Pirkanmaa
South Ostrobothnia
Central Ostrobothnia
North Ostrobothnia
1862 establishments in Finland
Railway lines opened in 1862